Michael "Mike" Bonser (né Merz, born 14 October 1970) is an Australian professional darts player who plays in the Professional Darts Corporation events.

Career
Bonser made his World Series of Darts debut at the 2018 Melbourne Darts Masters, where he was whitewashed to Peter Wright of Scotland.

References

External links

1970 births
Living people
Australian darts players
Professional Darts Corporation associate players
People from New South Wales